Easington District Council elections were generally held every four years between the council's creation in 1974 and its abolition in 2009. Easington was a non-metropolitan district in County Durham, England. On 1 April 2009 the council's functions passed to Durham County Council, which became a unitary authority.

Political control
The first election to the council was held in 1973, initially operating as a shadow authority before coming into its powers on 1 April 1974. Political control of the council from 1973 until its abolition in 2009 was held by the following parties:

Leadership
The last leader of the council was:

Council elections

By-election results
The following is an incomplete list of by-elections to Easington District Council.

Notes

References

Council elections in County Durham
District council elections in England